Roberto Olabe Aranzábal (born 20 October 1967) is a Spanish former football goalkeeper and manager.

Playing career
Born in Vitoria-Gasteiz, Basque Country, Olabe enjoyed a ten-year senior career. His professional input consisted of 35 Segunda División games with UD Salamanca, and two in La Liga with Real Sociedad.

Olabe made his debut in the Spanish top flight on 15 October 1995, starting in a 1–2 home loss against CP Mérida. During his four-year tenure at the Anoeta Stadium, he played second-fiddle to Alberto.

Coaching career
Olabe retired in June 1999, at not yet 32. He was immediately appointed coach of Real Sociedad's youths. 

Late into the 2001–02 season, Olabe replaced the fired John Toshack at the helm of the first team, going on to avoid team relegation after collecting five wins and two draws from nine matches. On 2 July 2002, he and assistant manager Jesús María Zamora were handed a four-month ban as the former did not possess a coaching licence. 

After acting as the club's director of football, Olabe was appointed SD Eibar coach on 27 December 2005. He was dismissed less than three months later, as the second-tier campaign eventually ended in relegation.

In 2010–11, Olabe was one of three managers in charge of UD Almería – where he had already worked in directorial capacities– who returned to the second division after a four-year stay. In the ensuing summer, he signed with Real Unión in the same capacity.

Olabe became Real Sociedad's director of football in March 2018, replacing Loren in the role.

Personal life
Olabe's son, also named Roberto, is also a footballer. A winger, he also represented Real Sociedad.

References

External links

1967 births
Living people
Spanish footballers
Footballers from Vitoria-Gasteiz
Association football goalkeepers
La Liga players
Segunda División players
Segunda División B players
CD Mirandés footballers
Deportivo Alavés players
UD Salamanca players
Real Sociedad footballers
Spanish football managers
La Liga managers
Segunda División managers
Segunda División B managers
Real Sociedad managers
SD Eibar managers
UD Almería managers
Real Unión managers
Real Sociedad non-playing staff